Captain George Cockburne (died 20 July 1770) was a naval administrator, who went on to be Comptroller of the Navy.

Career
Cockburne was appointed Comptroller of the Navy and promoted to Captain in 1756. In 1770, while still comptroller, he stood unsuccessfully in the Scarborough by-election with support from the Marquess of Granby.

Family
He married Lady Caroline Forrester.

References

1770 deaths
Royal Navy officers
Lords of the Admiralty
Year of birth unknown
18th-century Royal Navy personnel